Stephen Jacob Chanock (born April 15, 1956) is an American physician and geneticist. He currently serves as Director of the Division of Cancer Epidemiology and Genetics at the U.S. National Cancer Institute (NCI).

Biography

Stephen Chanock is the son of NIH scientist Robert M. Chanock, discoverer of human respiratory syncytial virus.

Chanock completed undergraduate studies at Princeton University in 1978, and his medical training at Harvard Medical School in 1983. He completed clinical training in pediatrics, pediatric infectious diseases, and pediatric hematology/oncology at Boston Children’s Hospital and the Dana–Farber Cancer Institute, Boston, MA. He has held multiple positions, both in research and scientific leadership over his career at the NCI. He has received numerous awards for his work in the discovery and characterization of cancer susceptibility regions in the human genome. These include the Niehaus, Southorth, Weissenbach Award in Clinical Cancer Genetics and the NIH Directors Award. Chanock is an elected member of Association of American Physicians, the American Epidemiology Society and the Society for Pediatric Research. He is the author of over 900 publications and dozens of book chapters.

Since 1995, Chanock has served as the Medical Director for Camp Fantastic, a week-long recreational camp for pediatric cancer patients.

Research activities

Chanock co-leads several international consortial studies to identify and characterize the genetics of cancer susceptibility including BRCA Challenge, Game-On, and the NCI Cohort Consortium. His work focuses specifically on efforts to clarify the genetic architecture of cancer susceptibility, the scope of genetic mosaicism and its contribution to cancer risk, and how germline variation informs our understanding of somatic alterations in cancer.

Awards
 NIH Directors Award (2008, 2013)
 The Niehaus, Southorth, Weissenbach Award in Clinical Cancer Genetics, Memorial Sloan Kettering Cancer Center, New York, NY (2010)
 NCI Directors Award (2014)
 Society for Pediatric Research (elected 1998)
 Association of American Physicians (elected 2013)
 American Epidemiology Society (elected 2013)

References

Living people
American geneticists
Harvard Medical School alumni
1956 births
Princeton University alumni